The Public Health Museum in Massachusetts is a museum in Tewksbury, Massachusetts in the United States. It opened on September 30, 1994, the 100th anniversary year of the Old Administration building at the historic Tewksbury Hospital, where the museum is housed.

The museum occupies a section on the ground floor of the Old Administration Building and includes both permanent and temporary exhibits on the history and impact of public health in Massachusetts and beyond. The museum also offers a walking tour of the Tewksbury Hospital campus exploring its history, its architecture, the lives of its patients and staff, and its connection to public health.

References

External links

1994 establishments in Massachusetts
Museums established in 1994
Museums in Middlesex County, Massachusetts
Medical museums in the United States
Public health in the United States
Tewksbury, Massachusetts